Cecil Aldary Portocarrero Thiré (28 May 1943 – 9 October 2020) was a Brazilian television, film and stage actor, and director.

Life and career 

Thiré was born in Rio de Janeiro, the only son of actress Tônia Carrero and artist Carlos Arthur Thiré. He was named after his grandfather Cecil Thiré, a mathematics teacher at Colégio Pedro II and textbook writer.

At the age of 17, he studied acting with Adolfo Celi and worked intensely in theater in the 1960s.

At age 18, he had his first professional job, as  assistant director to Ruy Guerra in Os Fuzis. At 19, he directed his first film, the short film Os Mendigos. In 1967, he directed  the feature films O diabo mora no sangue and, later, O Ibrahim do subúrbio. As an actor, he was in the cast of more than twenty films, having started at the age of nine, in a small appearance in Tico-Tico no fubá, starring Tônia Carrero.

On television, he acted in  telenovelas, miniseries, and comedy programs on Rede Tupi, Rede Globo, and RecordTV. His debut was in 1967, on TV Tupi's telenovela Angústia de amar.

Thiré died on October 9, 2020, aged 77, of Parkinson's disease.

Career

Film

Television

Stage

References

External links 

 Relação completa das peças nas quais Cecil Thiré participou, como ator e diretor
 Enciclopédia Itaú Cultural - verbete Cecil Thiré
 Entrevista a Isto É Gente
 Cecil Thiré na Paixão de Cristo 
 Teledramaturgia

1943 births
2020 deaths
Deaths from Parkinson's disease
Actors from Rio de Janeiro (state)
Brazilian people of French descent
Neurological disease deaths in Rio de Janeiro (state)